Krok Lake is an irregular-shaped glacial lake about  long in the southeast part of the Vestfold Hills of Princess Elizabeth Land in Antarctica. The lake was partially mapped by Norwegian cartographers from air photos taken by the Lars Christensen Expedition (1936–37) and named "Krokvatnet" (the crooked lake). It was mapped in its entirety by Australian National Antarctic Research Expeditions, utilizing air photos taken in 1957–58.

References

Lakes of Princess Elizabeth Land
Ingrid Christensen Coast